Nino Chkuaseli (born September 22, 1988) is a Georgian women's football goalkeeper. Between 2010 and 2013, she played in the Turkish Women's First Football League for Trabzon İdmanocağı with jersey number 22. She is a member of the Georgia women's national football team.

Playing career

Club
Chkuaseli played for Dinamo Tbilisi before she transferred to Trabzon İdmanocağı in Turkey. She capped 55 times in three seasons from 2010 to 2013 for the Trabzon-based team.

She took part at the 2007–08 UEFA Women's Cup – Group A7 (forerunner of the UEFA Women's Champions League) playing in three matches for the Georgian club Dinamo Tbilisi.

International
She made her international debut with the Georgia women's U-19 team appearing in the UEFA European Women's Under-19 Championship (First qualifying round) against Russia on September 29, 2005.

With the Georgia women's national team, she took part at the 2015 FIFA Women's World Cup qualification (UEFA) – Group B matches.

Career statistics
.

Honours
 Turkish Women's First League
 Trabzon İdmanocağı
 Third places (1): 2011–12

References

External links

1988 births
Living people
Women's association football goalkeepers
Women's footballers from Georgia (country)
Georgia (country) women's international footballers
Trabzon İdmanocağı women's players
Expatriate sportspeople from Georgia (country) in Turkey
Expatriate women's footballers from Georgia (country)
Expatriate women's footballers in Turkey